Geneva Hall and Trinity Hall are historic dormitory buildings located at Hobart & William Smith College in Geneva, Ontario County, New York. Geneva Hall (1822) and Trinity Hall (1837) are the two oldest main structures on the campus of Hobart and William Smith Colleges, however, many of the houses date from earlier and Durfee House is the oldest, dating from the 1780s.  Both are three story, nine bay structures built of fieldstone with belt courses between the stories.

They were listed on the National Register of Historic Places in 1973.

References

External links
Hobart & William Smith Colleges website

Residential buildings on the National Register of Historic Places in New York (state)
Residential buildings completed in 1822
Buildings and structures in Ontario County, New York
Geneva, New York
University and college dormitories in the United States
Hobart and William Smith Colleges
National Register of Historic Places in Ontario County, New York
1822 establishments in New York (state)